Archie Raymond Twitchell (November 28, 1906 – January 31, 1957) was a pilot for over three decades between the 1920s and the 1950s. He also had a second profession as a movie actor. He was a captain in the US Army Air Force. He was killed in the 1957 Pacoima mid-air collision.

Background
Twitchell was born in Pendleton, Oregon on November 28, 1906. He made his first solo flight in 1923. Two years later, he began an acting career that took him through over 100 movies and television shows. His six-foot, one-inch stature with his grey eyes and brown hair suited the camera. He was sometimes billed as Michael Brandan/Brandon/Branden.

Between pictures he flew. In 1936 he toured air shows across the country and in 1942 was commissioned a second lieutenant in the Air Force. During the war he tested fighter planes in North Africa and flew transports. In 1951 he went to Israel and tested planes for the Israeli air force. Since February 1955 he had been a production test pilot for the Douglas Aircraft Co.

Crash
On January 31, 1957, Twitchell was co-pilot on a test flight of a new Douglas DC-7B over Southern California. The four crew failed to see a  Northrop F-89 Scorpion, also on a test flight, in time to avoid a mid-air collision. The fighter, coming out of 90-degree turn, struck the DC-7B almost head-on at 1118 hrs., ~1–2 miles NE of the Hansen Dam spillway, severing ~8 1/2 feet of the transport's port wing outboard of station 613. The DC-7B continued on a westward heading for about 4 miles before coming down. The CAB accident report states that "At 1118 activity in the Douglas radio room was interrupted by an emergency transmission from N 8210H. The voices were recognized by radio personnel familiar with the crew members. Pilot Cart first transmitted, 'Uncontrollable,' Copilot Twitchell then said, 'We're a midair collision – midair collision, 10 How (aircraft identification using phonetic How for H) we are going in – uncontrollable – uncontrollable – we are ... we've had it boy – poor jet too – told you we should take chutes – say goodbye to everybody.' Radio Operator Nakazawas voice was recognized and he concluded the tragic message with, 'We are spinning in the valley.' This final transmission from the flight is presented because it contained important information relative to the accident investigation. It not only establishes the midair collision but also indicates the DC-7 was rendered uncontrollable. It further indicates that Mr. Twitchell at least recognized the aircraft with which they collided as a jet. Further, the DC-7 spun during its descent to the ground." Airliner impacted across the street from Pacoima Junior High School – debris killed three students and injured some 74 others.

Burial
Twitchell is buried at Valhalla Memorial Park Cemetery, North Hollywood, Los Angeles County, California.

Filmography

References

External links

1906 births
1957 deaths
American aviators
American test pilots
Aviators killed in aviation accidents or incidents in the United States
United States Army Air Forces pilots of World War II
Victims of aviation accidents or incidents in 1957